Consistent football competitions were taken place in Ukraine in the beginning of the 20th century when the modern country was divided between Hungary, Poland, Romania, and Russia. The most progressive league where Ukrainians participated were Polish  and USSR championships (Dinamo Kyiv is known worldwide).

In the 1970s and 1980s, the backbone of the Soviet Union national football team were players out of the Dinamo Kyiv's first team while the team was also coached by the Kievan native and the Dinamo Kyiv franchise person -- Valery Lobanovsky. Oleh Blokhin, another Kievan native and the legendary Ukrainian player and coach, became the USSR national team leader in games participated and goals scored for the team. He reflected the mentorship of his coach, Valery Lobanovsky, and extending the long possessing football traditions of his native country by taking the Ukraine national team to quarter finals of the World Cup in 2006. Football Federation of Ukraine (FFU) was created and recognized by FIFA only in 1992. That led several players played for the Ukraine national team in 1993 to reconsider their choice by choosing their opportunities in more successful team of Russian Federation which was considered as the successor of the Soviet national team with all its success. By recognizing only the Russian team as the successor many Russian statisticians are advocating that as the main reason to consider the Ukrainian born footballers that played for the Soviet team to be Russians. The players such as Andrei Kanchelskis and Sergei Yuran are not included in the list for the reason choosing to play for the Russian team over the Ukrainian. Note that there are no Viktor Onopko or Andrei Karyaka as well, although the last one played several games for the junior squad of the national team.

While waiting for recognition from FIFA in 1992, the national team of Ukraine failed to gain to be seeded on time for the World Cup qualification competition from Europe.

List of Soviet Ukrainians  

Unofficial games

Ukrainian Olympians on the Soviet team

 Yozhef Betsa*
 Volodymyr Kaplychnyi
 Yozhef Sabo*
 Viktor Kolotov*
 Anatoliy Kuksov*
 Vyacheslav Semyonov
 Yuriy Yeliseyev
 Volodymyr Onyshchenko
 Oleh Blokhin

 Oleksandr Ponomarov (coach)
 Viktor Zvyahintsev
 Viktor Matviyenko
 Stefan Reshko
 Volodymyr Troshkin
 Mykhaylo Fomenko
 Anatoliy Konkov
 Leonid Buryak

 Volodymyr Veremeyev*
 Valeriy Lobanovskyi (coach)
 Volodymyr Bezsonov
 Sergei Baltacha
 Oleksiy Cherednyk*
 Vadym Tyshchenko
 Volodymyr Lyutyi
 Oleksiy Mykhaylychenko

Russian Olympians born in Ukraine 
 Sergey Shavlo
 Yuriy Istomin
 Vladimir Pilguy
 Sergey Andreyev
 Igor Dobrovolski
 Anatoliy Byshovets (coach)

Ukrainian footballers on the Soviet junior teams

 Valeriy Horbunov
 Yuriy Kovalyov*
 Petro Slobodyan
 Viktor Chanov
 Sergei Baltacha
 Anatoliy Demyanenko
 Serhiy Zhuravlyov
 Viktor Kaplun
 Andriy Bal
 Yaroslav Dumanskyi
 Anatoliy Radenko
 Oleh Luzhnyi
 Andriy Sydelnykov
 Serhiy Shmatovalenko
 Serhiy Zayets
 Rostyslav Potochnyak

 Valentyn Kryachko
 Hryhoriy Batych
 Oleksandr Sopko
 Serhiy Zharkov
 Yuriy Syvukha
 Yuriy Dehteryov*
 Viktor Kuznetsov*
 Leonid Shmuts
 Oleksandr Berezhnoy
 Viktor Nastashevskyi*
 Anatoliy Saulevych

 Serhiy Krakovskyi
 Serhiy Naidenko
 Serhiy Ovchynnykov*
 Valeriy Zubenko
 Mykhaylo Olefirenko
 Oleh Taran
 Ihor Lytvynenko
 Volodymyr Bednyi
 Oleh Benko*
 Serhiy Bezhenar
 Oleg Salenko*

 Anatoliy Mushchynka
 Yuriy Mokrytskyi
 Yuriy Moroz
 Oleh Matveyev*
 Valeriy Vysokos
 Mykola Rusyn
 Yuriy Makarov
 Yevhen Pokhlebayev
 Serhiy Scherbakov
 Volodymyr Sharan
 Serhiy Kandaurov*

Russian footballers born in Ukraine 
 Yuri Susloparov
 Gennadi Kostylev (coach)
 Oleksandr Pomazun
 Sergei Mamchur (Russia U-21)

 Grigori Bogemsky 1913
 Evgeni Aldonin 2002–07
 Artyom Bezrodny 1999
 Viktor Budyanskiy 2007
 Igor Dobrovolski 1992–98
 Oleksandr Horshkov 1998
 Andrei Kanchelskis 1992–98
 Andrei Karyaka 2001–05
 Vladimir Lebed 1995
 Roman Neustädter 2016–
 Yuriy Nikiforov 1993–2002
 Gennadiy Nizhegorodov 2000–03
 Viktor Onopko 1992–2004
 Sergei Podpaly 1992–94
 Sergei Semak 1997–2010
 Vladislav Ternavsky 1994–96
 Ilya Tsymbalar 1994–99
 Sergei Yuran 1992–99
 Anton Shvets 2018–

Senior national team all-time records
Here included players that with help of FIFA, the Russian Football Union claims of their own. Such players, Oleg Blokhin, Oleg Protasov, and Anatoliy Demyanenko, still are the indicators of class for all players in Ukraine. Those players committed their playing career to the clubs of the Lower Dnipro river region.

Most capped Ukraine players

Top Ukraine goalscorers

List of Ukrainian coaches coaching other national teams
In bold are coaches that eventually coached the Ukrainian football national team.
 	
Oleksandr Ponomariov ( Soviet national football team 1972)
Oleh Bazilevich ( Soviet national football team 1974–1976, 1979), ( Bulgaria Olympic football team 1988–1989), ( Kuwait national under-23 football team 1995–1996)
Valery Lobanovsky ( Soviet national football team 1975–1976, 1982–1983, 1986–1990), ( UAE national football team 1990–1993), ( Kuwait national football team 1994–1996)
Valery Yaremchenko ( Syria national football team 1985–1987)
Anatoliy Azarenkov ( Syria national football team 1987–1990, 1992), ( Kuwait national under-20 football team 1993–1997)
Mykhailo Fomenko ( Iraq national football team 1990), ( Guinea national football team 1994)
Anatoliy Byshovets ( South Korea national football team 1994–1995, South Korea national under-23 football team 1995–1996)
Volodymyr Muntian ( Guinea national football team 1995–1998)
Viktor Pozhechevskyi ( Turkmenistan national football team 1998)
Volodymyr Salkov ( Uzbekistan national football team 2000–2001)
Vladimir Bessonov ( Turkmenistan national football team 2002–2003)
Viktor Pasulko ( Moldova national football team 2002–2005)
Semen Altman ( Moldova national football team 2019)

References

Soviet Union national football team
Ukrainians
 USSR national football team
Ukrainian Soviet Socialist Republic people
Association football player non-biographical articles